Bheemla Nayak is a 2022 Indian Telugu-language action thriller film directed by Saagar K Chandra from a screenplay by Trivikram Srinivas. It is a remake of the 2020 Malayalam film Ayyappanum Koshiyum. The film stars Pawan Kalyan, Rana Daggubati, Nithya Menen and Samyuktha Menon.

Bheemla Nayak was filmed primarily in Hyderabad between January 2021 and February 2022 although temporarily halted by the COVID-19 pandemic. It has music composed by Thaman S with cinematography by Ravi K. Chandran and editing by Naveen Nooli. Bheemla Nayak was  theatrically released on 25 February 2022 and opened to mixed reviews.

Plot 
Daniel "Danny" Shekhar, an ex-Havaldar, and his driver cross the state border from Telangana to Andhra Pradesh on a night. The police at the check post stop them for carrying liquor beyond the permissible quota but a drunken Danny, who is furious that his sleep is disturbed, beats them up. SI Bheemla Nayak arrives and hits Danny, explaining his offense. Danny refuses by saying that his destination was in Telangana but Nayak arrests him nonetheless since Danny has physically crossed the border. A constable humiliates Danny by removing his loin cloth, which further aggravates his anger.

The police file an FIR but after going through his phone contacts, they are shocked to know that Danny is the son of an influential politician and is connected to politically powerful men. Nayak informs the same to CI Kodanda Ram who asks him to treat Danny with respect. Nayak tries to reconcile with Danny but he refuses to budge. Nayak threatens him with a gun and they sit together. Danny then annoys Nayak for a drink. With no option left, Nayak opens a bottle from the seized liquor and serves, which Danny secretly films on his phone. The following day, Danny is taken to court where he is sentenced to 14-day imprisonment.

Danny's lawyer bails out him, subject to his biweekly appearance at the police station. In an act of vengeance, Danny releases the recorded video to the press. Nayak is arrested with an order to investigate his actions. Danny challenges Nayak in front of the police station. The villagers, who are staunch supporters of Nayak, try to attack Danny but Nayak stops them by saying their fight is personal. A local toddy shop owner, Nagaraju, with a grudge against Nayak, joins hands with Danny. A senior politician arranges a truce between them, where Danny would delay sending the evidence to SP, and his mandatory appearance for two weeks would be waived off. However, on the insistence of his father Jeevan Kumar, Danny sends the evidence anyway and Nayak is suspended. The following day, Nayak blows up Nagaraju's bar with explosives. Danny meets Nayak en-route in a bus and tries to assert his dominance by saying that he made Nayak lose his job. Nayak replies that even if the battle is lost, he'd return to win the war.

The police seize Danny's vehicle and arrest the driver in retaliation. Meanwhile, Jeevan meets the SP and submits the evidence that Nayak's wife Suguna has indulged in smuggling by illegally buying forest goods from tribals which results in her arrest warrant. Knowing this, Nayak and Suguna, move along with their baby to a remote place in the forest. Jeevan's men, who track their location and steal Suguna's phone, threaten Nayak for her life. Furious Nayak attacks Jeevan's men in a lodge. Danny is unaware of his father's actions and asks Nayak to stop beating them. But Nayak blows up Danny's vehicle and they engage in a fight. The police arrive and stop them. Kodanda Ram tells Danny that Nayak is revered by the locals as an equivalent of the village deity Kokkira Devara, hence it's not wise to have a tussle with him. Danny learns that 15 years ago, Nayak killed a ruthless contractor who preyed on tribal girls in order to save them and was seen by the people as their protecting saviour. 

Danny asks Jeevan whether they should compromise, but he refuses. On Jeevan's demand, the SP goes to their place and arrests Suguna, angering Nayak. He goes and meets Jeevan at his home and forces him to call Danny at gunpoint. Danny, who has Nayak's baby in custody, asks him to meet at Erra Thanda, a place outside the police jurisdiction of both the states for a final duel. They fight intensively and just as Nayak is about to use his signature technique of removing an arm, Danny's wife arrives and pleads for mercy. Nayak recognizes her as one of the tribal girls he saved long ago and allows them to leave. They willingly withdraw the cases on each other. Nayak, who is transferred to Telangana, arrives at Danny's home. They re-introduce each other and shake hands.

Cast

Production

Development 
In June 2020, Sithara Entertainments bought the Telugu remake rights of the 2020 Malayalam film Ayyappanum Koshiyum. Saagar K Chandra who earlier directed Appatlo Okadundevadu (2016) was signed to helm the project. Several actors including Ravi Teja, Nandamuri Balakrishna, and Rana Daggubati were approached for the lead role. In October 2020, the film was officially announced with Pawan Kalyan as one of the leads, in the role of a police officer originally played by Biju Menon.

In December, Daggubati was confirmed the other lead, playing the role of Prithviraj Sukumaran from the original. Daggubati later revealed that he was on board for the project before Kalyan signed in. He compared his character Daniel Shekar with his earlier role Arjun Prasad from his debut film Leader (2010). While both are aspiring politicians, he said that Daniel was "an entitled guy who played dirty."

The filming was officially launched with a pooja ceremony in Hyderabad. The film used a working title "Production No.12" and was colloquially referred as PSPK Rana Movie. The official title Bheemla Nayak was unveiled on 15 August 2021.

Casting 
Writer-director Trivikram Srinivas was hired for the film's screenplay and dialogues. Thaman S was signed to compose the music with cinematography by Prasad Murella, editing by Naveen Nooli and production design handled by AS Prakash. In July 2021, Murella opted out of the project and cinematographer Ravi K. Chandran joined the film as the replacement.

Sai Pallavi was approached to play opposite Kalyan, while Aishwarya Rajesh was cast to be a pair with Daggubati. In March 2021, reports emerged that Pallavi may not join the project but director Saagar K Chandra refuted them by stating that she would join the production in April. However, Pallavi eventually opted out due to scheduling conflicts. In July, Nithya Menen was cast in place of Pallavi while Samuthirakani is signed to play a pivotal role. In September, Aishwarya left the project due to scheduling conflicts. Samyuktha Menon was confirmed to replace her in October. In December 2021, Brahmanandam confirmed through an interview that he was playing a role in the film.

Filming 
Principal photography of the film began in January 2021. A 25-day schedule took place at an aluminium factory in Hyderabad. In March, action scenes featuring Kalyan and Daggubati were shot under the choreography of Dhilip Subbarayan. The second schedule of film began in April. Later, the shoot was halted due to the second wave of COVID-19 pandemic in India. 30% of the shoot is completed by June 2021, and a special set was constructed in Hyderabad for the next schedule. Filming resumed in July 2021. A new schedule began in December 2021, filming took place at Madanpalle Yellamma Temple in Vikarabad. Final sequences, including a promotional song featuring Kalyan were shot in February 2022. The shoot was wrapped up on 17 February 2022, a week ahead of its scheduled release.

Music

The film's soundtrack is composed by Thaman S in his second collaboration with Pawan Kalyan after Vakeel Saab.

Release

Theatrical 
Bheemla Nayak was released on 25 February 2022 one day later after the release of Valimai starring Ajith Kumar and Kartikeya Gummakonda. Earlier in July 2021, it was announced that the film would release on 12 January 2022, coinciding with the festival of Sankranti. However in December 2021, it was postponed to 25 February 2022 after requests by producers D. V. V. Danayya, Vamsi, and Dil Raju as their films RRR and Radhe Shyam were scheduled to release at the same time. Later in January 2022, the makers announced their intention to release the film either on 25 February or 1 April, whichever is conducive for a theatrical release due the prevailing COVID situation. In mid-February, the film was confirmed to be released theatrically on 25 February 2022.

The film's global theatrical rights were sold for 102.5 crore, including the rights of Telugu states which were pegged at 84.3 crore. The pre-release event scheduled to take place on 21 February 2022 was postponed to 23 February in the wake of death of Andhra Pradesh's Minister Mekapati Goutham Reddy as a sign of respect.

In February 2022, vandals slashed screens in movie theatres playing the film in the Toronto area.

Home media 
The digital distribution rights of the film were acquired by Disney+ Hotstar and aha while the satellite rights were acquired by Star Maa. The film was originally scheduled to stream on Disney+ Hotstar and aha on 25 March 2022, but it streamed a day earlier on 24 March 2022.

Reception

Box office
Bheemla Nayak grossed 161–193 crore worldwide in its theatrical run. On its opening day, the film grossed  crore worldwide, including 43.1 crore in the domestic territory and  million from overseas. The netted 37 crore in India and emerged as the best post-pandemic opener in Andhra Pradesh and Telangana. Box Office India reported that the lower ticket prices in Andhra coupled with stricter norms by the state government has negatively impacted the film's collections. In its opening weekend, the film grossed  crore worldwide, of which 89.40 crore came from India, and the rest from the overseas. The film grossed 50 crore in 6 days, with the distributor's share standing at  crore.

After 10 days of its theatrical run, the film collected a worldwide distributor's share of  crore, with a gross of  crore. The film became a profitable venture in the United States, grossing $2.4 million in 11 days.

Critical reception
Bheemla Nayak received positive reviews from the critics, with praise for "terrific mass elements" and "intense confrontation scenes". Writing for The Hindu, Sangeetha Devi Dundoo termed Bheemla Nayak "racy, masala-laden adaptation," praising the screenplay, score and cinematography. Thadhagath Pathi of The Times of India also echoed the same while opining that the climax could have been fleshed out better. On performances, Pathi wrote: "Bheemla Nayak is an example of what makes Pawan Kalyan such a huge star [..]. Rana Daggubati is top notch and this film is proof of how well he can act. Nithya Menen is decent in her role but it’s Samyuktha Menon who delivers a mature performance."

Ram Venkat Srikar of Cinema Express wrote, "Although it is largely faithful to the central conceit of the original, Bheemla Nayak is bigger, fiercer, and massier." While saying Bheemla Nayak traded "depth for whistles", Srikar felt that this choice did "more good than harm" to the film. Hindustan Times Haricharan Pudipeddi opined that despite not recreating the original's magic, the remake still worked in its own ways, owing to "Kalyan's machismo" and "Daggubati's impressive performance."  Sankeertha Varma of Firstpost felt that Trivikram not only tried to retain the essence the original but also successfully weaved mythology around his protagonists, in addition to a flashback that tied the loose ends.

A Deccan Chronicle reviewer called the film an "engaging experience," and wrote: "The director has managed the extremely difficult task of engaging the audience with a simplistic, single-thread plot, through with his writing." Janani.K of India Today wrote that "the remake turned out to be better than original, that has been spruced up with masala and mass moments but wisely have cut short the runtime as well". On the other hand, The Indian Express critic Manoj Kumar R was critical of the film for deviating much from the original, stating: "In Bheemla Nayak, we get no sense of the place where the story plays out. The film is a very shallow reading of the text of Ayyappanum Koshiyum."

Notes

References

External links 

2020s masala films
2020s Telugu-language films
2022 action drama films
2022 films
Film productions suspended due to the COVID-19 pandemic
Films postponed due to the COVID-19 pandemic
Films scored by Thaman S
Fictional portrayals of the Andhra Pradesh Police
Fictional portrayals of the Telangana Police
Films set in Andhra Pradesh
Films set in Telangana
Films shot in Hyderabad, India
Films shot in Telangana
Films shot in Andhra Pradesh
Indian action drama films
Telugu remakes of Malayalam films
Films directed by Saagar K Chandra